Gorgiani is a municipal unit of the Grevena municipality. Before the 2011 local government reform it was a municipality of its own. The 2011 census recorded 885 residents in the municipal unit. Gorgiani covers an area of 204.555 km2. The seat of the municipality was in Kipoureio.

See also
 List of settlements in the Grevena regional unit

References

Populated places in Grevena (regional unit)
Former municipalities in Western Macedonia